Beyond Games was an American video game developer. It was founded in 1992 by Kris Johnson. The first release from the company was BattleWheels for the Atari Lynx, winner of the 1993 Consumer Electronics Show Innovations Award. Their follow-up, CyberVirus was planned for release the following year, but abandoned due to sagging sales of the platform. Assets and code were sold to Songbird Productions, who completed and published the game in 2002.

Before they went under, they were working on a game titled Doomsday Rescue. In 2003, many of their employees, including Kris Johnson, would go on to form Smart Bomb Interactive (now known as WildWorks), where they continue to make games.

Games

References

External links
Beyond Games - Homepage (archived)

Company summary from GameSpot
Company summary from IGN

Defunct video game companies of the United States
Video game companies established in 1992
Video game development companies